Mahesana, also spelled Mehsana, is one of the 182 Legislative Assembly constituencies of Gujarat state in India. It is part of Mahesana district, numbered as 15-Mahesana and is one of the seven Vidhan Sabha seats which fall under Mahesana Lok Sabha constituency. Its current MLA is Nitinbhai Patel.

Segments
The assembly seat represents the following segments. This assembly seat represents the following segments:

Mahesana Taluka (Part) Villages – Taleti, Tavadiya, Chitrodipura, Dela, Ucharpi, Dediyasan, Nagalpur, Lakhavad, Devrasan, Rampura (Kukas), Kukas, Heduva Hanumat, Palavasana, Hebuva, Kadvasan, Kherva, Punasan, Sanganpur, Mulsan, Padhariya, Dhandhusan, Gojhariya, Meu, Balvantpura, Akhaj, Bhakadiya, Geratpur, Kochva, Ditasan, Dholasan, Jetalpur, Chaluva, Langhnaj, Charadu, Saldi, Jamnapur, Jornang, Mandali, Navi Sedhavi, Juni Sedhavi, Hadvi, Vadasma, Mahesana (M), Ambaliyasan (CT).

Members of Legislative Assembly

Election results

2022 

-->

2017

2012

2007

2002

See also
 Mahesana Lok Sabha constituency
 List of constituencies of the Gujarat Legislative Assembly
 Mahesana district

References

External links
 

Assembly constituencies of Gujarat
Mehsana district
Mehsana